Moral Orel is an American stop-motion animated television series for adults that premiered on Adult Swim on December 13, 2005. The series was created by Dino Stamatopoulos with production studio Williams Street.

Series overview

Episodes

Season 1 (2005–06)
Three episodes in this season had to be cleared by Cartoon Network's Standards and Practices office before they could be aired: "God's Chef" (strong sexual themes), "Loyalty" (depictions of homosexuals and violence against them), and "Maturity" (alcohol consumption by a minor). As a result, they were delayed by several months and premiered out of production order.

Season 2 (2006–07)

Season 3 (2008)

Special (2012)

Lost episodes
According to Dino Stamatopoulos in the commentary for the series finale, there were seven finished episode scripts that Adult Swim chose not to produce due to their decision to cancel the series/roll back the number of season-three episodes from 20 to 13. It was suggested that Adult Swim might be willing to make a "Moral Orel special" in the future, but Stamatopolous stated that he declined the offer to move on to other projects, resulting in the creation of "Honor" as a series finale for the character.

Had the show not been cancelled and cut down to 13 episodes, its second half would have played out quite differently: Orel's paternal grandfather would have joined the cast, appearing in an episode that happens after the events of "Sacrifice" while Clay goes to retrieve the body of the bear Orel shot. Most of the season's latter half would focus on Orel's relationship with his dying grandfather, who would help further Orel's emotional growth into adulthood and help him reconcile his faith with life's realities. Other aborted plotlines would involve Clay's affair with Miss Censordoll and Bloberta's affair with Officer Papermouth, culminating in Orel's grandfather's death and Orel's transformation into a goth-type figure in the wake of the loss of the only good parental figure in his life. 

Some of the aborted episodes involve:

Clay Puppington's father finding out he's terminally ill and moving in with the Puppingtons and sharing a room and bed with Orel. 
Bloberta and Officer Papermouth becoming lovers, and Bloberta finally achieving happiness through her relationship with the divorced police officer.
A second episode involving Orel and Christina's relationship.
Reverend Putty becoming cold towards women after the events of "Sunday"/"Sacrifice", which results in him finally getting dates with Moralton women; Florence slims down and Reverend Putty becomes attracted to her and ultimately wins her heart.  
Miss Sculptham's further attempts to find love, including a lesbian relationship and one with a prisoner, both of which end badly because Moralton society frowns on each relationship and refuses to let her marry either one (a denial that she compares to being raped). She also discovers that when she was raped she was pregnant with twins and her coathanger abortion only killed one of them. 
An episode focusing on Shapey and Block: the two unruly boys bond, with the result that each becomes less hellion-like.

"Abstinence"
There is also another lost episode, "Abstinence", animated entirely by David Tuber and Morgana Ignis, two of MORAL OREL's production staff, that was finished after they learned the show had been canceled. The episode is rendered in a cruder-than-normal style using clay figures, since the animators lacked access to the puppets normally used to create each episode. The episode centers around Doughy instead of Orel, and was originally screened only once at a special live event, "Sunday with Moral Orel" in San Francisco on January 18, 2009. On May 26, 2015, series animator David Tuber uploaded the episode on his YouTube channel.

See also
 Moral Orel
 List of Moral Orel characters

Notes

References

Lists of American adult animated television series episodes
Lists of American comedy-drama television series episodes
Lists of American sitcom episodes